Charl Crous (born 25 September 1990 in Johannesburg) is a South African swimmer. At the 2012 Summer Olympics he finished 33rd overall in the heats in the Men's 100 metre backstroke.  He was also part of the South African 4 x 100 m medley relay team.

References

External links
 

1990 births
Living people
South African male swimmers
Male backstroke swimmers
Olympic swimmers of South Africa
Swimmers at the 2012 Summer Olympics
Commonwealth Games silver medallists for South Africa
Commonwealth Games medallists in swimming
Swimmers at the 2010 Commonwealth Games
African Games gold medalists for South Africa
African Games silver medalists for South Africa
African Games medalists in swimming
Competitors at the 2011 All-Africa Games
Swimmers from Johannesburg
South African people of British descent
20th-century South African people
21st-century South African people
Medallists at the 2010 Commonwealth Games